Masinde Muliro University of Science and Technology or MMUST, formerly Western University College of Science and Technology, is a non-profit public university in Kenya. The university is named after Masinde Muliro, a Kenyan politician who helped found the institution. It has approximately 25,000 students across its branches: Main Campus (Kakamega Town) and its two satellite campuses, Webuye Campus and Bungoma Campus

History 
MMUST became a fully accredited public university in 2007. Before being elevated to full university status, it was a constituent college of Moi University. The school was established in January 1972, known as Western College or WECO, a college of Arts and Applied Sciences awarding certificates and diplomas in technical courses.

In 2002 it became a constituent college of Moi University and changed its name to Western University College of Science and Technology. The university is open to the community to use its resources e.g. the library and other facilities.

Its Vice Chancellor, currently just ended his 5-year term, Prof. Fredrick Otieno. Prof. Joseph Bosire is on acting capacity. The current Vice Chancellor is Prof. Solomon Shibairo.

Academics 
Officially recognized by the Commission for University Education of Kenya, Masinde Muliro University of Science and Technology (MMUST) offers courses and programmes leading to officially recognized higher education degrees such as pre-bachelor degrees (i.e. certificates, diplomas, associate or foundation), bachelor degrees, master degrees and doctorate degrees in several areas of study. The 15 years old Kenyan higher-education institution has a selective admission policy based on students' past academic record and grades. The admission rate range is 70-80% making this Kenyan higher education organization a somewhat selective institution. International applicants are eligible to apply for enrollment. MMUST also provides several academic and non-academic facilities and services to students including a library, sports facilities, study abroad and exchange programs, online courses and distance learning opportunities, as well as administrative services.

MMUST offers 400 different academic programmes at the undergraduate and graduate levels across its 11 schools. The schools and departments include:

 Agric., Vet., Science & Tech.;
 Art & Social Sciences;
 Business & Economics;
 Computing & Informatics;
 Disaster Management;
 Education;
 Engineering & the Built Environment;
 Medicine;
 Natural Sciences;
 Nursing & Midwifery;
 Public Health;

ISO Certification 
ISO 9001:2015  Quality Management System

Accreditations

Institutional Accreditation 
Commission for University Education of Kenya

TVET Authority

Other Specialized or Programmatic Accreditations 

 Engineers Board of Kenya (EBK) 
 Kenya Medical Practitioners and Dentists Board (KMPDB) 
 Commission on Collegiate Nursing Education (AACN)
 Association to Advance Collegiate Schools of Business (AACSB International)
 Council on Accreditation of Nurse Anesthesia Educational Programs (AANA

Memberships and Affiliations 

 Inter-University Council for East Africa (IUCEA)
 Association of African Universities (AAU)
 African Institute of Capacity Development (AICAD);World Association of Industrial and Technological Research Organizations (WAITRO)
 Institute of Directors Kenya
 Association of Commonwealth Universities (ACU)
 International Association of University Presidents (IAUP)
 African Council for Distance Education (ACDE)

References

External links
 http://www.mmust.ac.ke

Kakamega County
Public universities
Universities in Kenya
Educational institutions established in 1972
1972 establishments in Kenya
Research institutes
Technical universities and colleges